Belmont station is a Caltrain station in Belmont, California that replaced the Southern Pacific Railroad station nearby. It is served by local and limited service trains.

The modern elevated station was constructed in 1997 as part of a grade separation project.

References

External links

Caltrain Belmont station page

Caltrain stations in San Mateo County, California
Former Southern Pacific Railroad stations in California